The tidal force is a gravitational effect that stretches a body along the line towards the center of mass of another body due to a gradient (difference in strength) in gravitational field from the other body; it is responsible for diverse phenomena, including tides, tidal locking, breaking apart of celestial bodies and formation of ring systems within the Roche limit, and in extreme cases, spaghettification of objects. It arises because the gravitational field exerted on one body by another is not constant across its parts: the nearest side is attracted more strongly than the farthest side. It is this difference that causes a body to get stretched. Thus, the tidal force is also known as the differential force, as well as a secondary effect of the gravitational field.

In celestial mechanics, the expression tidal force can refer to a situation in which a body or material (for example, tidal water) is mainly under the gravitational influence of a second body (for example, the Earth), but is also perturbed by the gravitational effects of a third body (for example, the Moon). The perturbing force is sometimes in such cases called a tidal force (for example, the perturbing force on the Moon): it is the difference between the force exerted by the third body on the second and the force exerted by the third body on the first.

Explanation 

When a body (body 1) is acted on by the gravity of another body (body 2), the field can vary significantly on body 1 between the side of the body facing body 2 and the side facing away from body 2. Figure 4 shows the differential force of gravity on a spherical body (body 1) exerted by another body (body 2). These so-called tidal forces cause strains on both bodies and may distort them or even, in extreme cases, break one or the other apart. The Roche limit is the distance from a planet at which tidal effects would cause an object to disintegrate because the differential force of gravity from the planet overcomes the attraction of the parts of the object for one another. These strains would not occur if the gravitational field were uniform, because a uniform field only causes the entire body to accelerate together in the same direction and at the same rate.

Size and distance
The relationship of an astronomical body's size, to its distance from another body, strongly influences the magnitude of tidal force.  The tidal force acting on an astronomical body, such as the Earth, is directly proportional to the diameter of that astronomical body and inversely proportional to the cube of the distance from another body producing a gravitational attraction, such as the Moon or the Sun.  Tidal action on  bath tubs, swimming pools, lakes, and other small bodies of water is negligible.

Figure 3 is a graph showing how gravitational force declines with distance.  In this graph, the attractive force decreases in proportion to the square of the distance, while the slope relative to value decreases in direct proportion to the distance.  This is why the gradient or tidal force at any point is inversely proportional to the cube of the distance.

The tidal force corresponds to the difference in Y between two points on the graph, with one point on the near side of the body, and the other point on the far side.  The tidal force becomes larger, when the two points are either farther apart, or when they are more to the left on the graph, meaning closer to the attracting body.

For example, the Moon produces a greater tidal force on the Earth than the Sun, even though the Sun exerts a greater gravitational attraction on the Earth than the Moon, because the gradient is less.

Gravitational attraction is inversely proportional to the square of the distance from the source.  The attraction will be stronger on the side of a body facing the source, and weaker on the side away from the source.  The tidal force is proportional to the difference.

Sun, Earth, and Moon
As expected, the table below shows that the distance from the Moon to the Earth, is the same as the distance from the Earth to the Moon.  The Earth is 81 times more massive than the Moon but has roughly 4 times its radius.  As a result, at the same distance, the tidal force of the Earth at the surface of the Moon is about 20 times stronger than that of the Moon at the Earth's surface.

Effects 

In the case of an infinitesimally small elastic sphere, the effect of a tidal force is to distort the shape of the body without any change in volume. The sphere becomes an ellipsoid with two bulges, pointing towards and away from the other body. Larger objects distort into an ovoid, and are slightly compressed, which is what happens to the Earth's oceans under the action of the Moon. The Earth and Moon orbit about their common center of mass or barycenter, and their gravitational attraction provides the centripetal force necessary to maintain this motion. To an observer on the Earth, very close to this barycenter, the situation is one of the Earth as body 1 acted upon by the gravity of the Moon as body 2. All parts of the Earth are subject to the Moon's gravitational forces, causing the water in the oceans to redistribute, forming bulges on the sides near the Moon and far from the Moon.

When a body rotates while subject to tidal forces, internal friction results in the gradual dissipation of its rotational kinetic energy as heat. In the case for the Earth, and Earth's Moon, the loss of rotational kinetic energy results in a gain of about 2 milliseconds per century. If the body is close enough to its primary, this can result in a rotation which is tidally locked to the orbital motion, as in the case of the Earth's moon. Tidal heating produces dramatic volcanic effects on Jupiter's moon Io. Stresses caused by tidal forces also cause a regular monthly pattern of moonquakes on Earth's Moon.

Tidal forces contribute to ocean currents, which moderate global temperatures by transporting heat energy toward the poles. It has been suggested that variations in tidal forces correlate with cool periods in the global temperature record at 6- to 10-year intervals, and that harmonic beat variations in tidal forcing may contribute to millennial climate changes. No strong link to millennial climate changes has been found to date.

Tidal effects become particularly pronounced near small bodies of high mass, such as neutron stars or black holes, where they are responsible for the "spaghettification" of infalling matter. Tidal forces create the oceanic tide of Earth's oceans, where the attracting bodies are the Moon and, to a lesser extent, the Sun. Tidal forces are also responsible for tidal locking, tidal acceleration, and tidal heating. Tides may also induce seismicity.

By generating conducting fluids within the interior of the Earth, tidal forces also affect the Earth's magnetic field.

Formulation 

For a given (externally generated) gravitational field, the tidal acceleration at a point with respect to a body is obtained by vector subtraction of the gravitational acceleration at the center of the body (due to the given externally generated field) from the gravitational acceleration (due to the same field) at the given point. Correspondingly, the term tidal force is used to describe the forces due to tidal acceleration. Note that for these purposes the only gravitational field considered is the external one; the gravitational field of the body (as shown in the graphic) is not relevant. (In other words, the comparison is with the conditions at the given point as they would be if there were no externally generated field acting unequally at the given point and at the center of the reference body. The externally generated field is usually that produced by a perturbing third body, often the Sun or the Moon in the frequent example-cases of points on or above the Earth's surface in a geocentric reference frame.)

Tidal acceleration does not require rotation or orbiting bodies; for example, the body may be freefalling in a straight line under the influence of a gravitational field while still being influenced by (changing) tidal acceleration.

By Newton's law of universal gravitation and laws of motion, a body of mass m at distance R from the center of a sphere of mass M feels a force ,

 

equivalent to an acceleration ,

 

where  is a unit vector pointing from the body M to the body m (here, acceleration from m towards M has negative sign).

Consider now the acceleration due to the sphere of mass M experienced by a particle in the vicinity of the body of mass m. With R as the distance from the center of M to the center of m, let ∆r be the (relatively small) distance of the particle from the center of the body of mass m. For simplicity, distances are first considered only in the direction pointing towards or away from the sphere of mass M. If the body of mass m is itself a sphere of radius ∆r, then the new particle considered may be located on its surface, at a distance (R ± ∆r) from the centre of the sphere of mass M, and ∆r may be taken as positive where the particle's distance from M is greater than R. Leaving aside whatever gravitational acceleration may be experienced by the particle towards m on account of ms own mass, we have the acceleration on the particle due to gravitational force towards M as:

 

Pulling out the R2 term from the denominator gives:

 

 

The first term is the gravitational acceleration due to M at the center of the reference body , i.e., at the point where  is zero. This term does not affect the observed acceleration of particles on the surface of m because with respect to M, m (and everything on its surface) is in free fall. When the force on the far particle is subtracted from the force on the near particle, this first term cancels, as do all other even-order terms. The remaining (residual) terms represent the difference mentioned above and are tidal force (acceleration) terms. When ∆r is small compared to R, the terms after the first residual term are very small and can be neglected, giving the approximate tidal acceleration  for the distances ∆r considered, along the axis joining the centers of m and M:

 

When calculated in this way for the case where ∆r is a distance along the axis joining the centers of m and M,  is directed outwards from to the center of m (where ∆r is zero).

Tidal accelerations can also be calculated away from the axis connecting the bodies m and M, requiring a vector calculation.

The tidal accelerations at the surfaces of planets in the Solar System are generally very small. Hence the tide-raising force (acceleration) due to the Sun is about 45% of that due to the Moon. The solar tidal acceleration at the Earth's surface was first given by Newton in the Principia.

See also 
 Amphidromic point
 Disrupted planet
 Galactic tide
 Tidal resonance
 Tidal stripping
 Tidal tensor
 Spacetime curvature

References

External links 
 Gravitational Tides by J. Christopher Mihos of Case Western Reserve University
 Audio: Cain/Gay – Astronomy Cast Tidal Forces – July 2007.
 
 
 Myths about Gravity and Tides by Mikolaj Sawicki of John A. Logan College and the University of Colorado.
 Tidal Misconceptions by Donald E. Simanek

 
Tides
Gravity
Force
Effects of gravitation
Concepts in astronomy